Arthur Hoops (1870 – September 17, 1916) was an American stage and screen actor.

Biography
Born in Chicago in 1870, on the stage Hoops was primarily associated with actor James K. Hackett. From 1900 on Hoops supported or costarred with Hackett in three Ruritanian themed plays Rupert of Hentzau, The Pride of Jennico and most famously The Prisoner of Zenda. Hoops also appeared in Alice of Old Vincennes in 1901 with Virginia Harned. Both he and Hackett were well over 6'4" and made worthy adversaries in the famous duelling scene from Zenda. It was the most famous duelling scene in the American theatre at the turn of the 20th century.

Hoops moved on to silent film in 1914. As his screen career progressed Hoops appeared in several films with Mary Pickford, one film with Marguerite Clark and finished his career in over half a dozen films at Metro Studios starring early screen vamp Olga Petrova. Hoops died in Los Angeles at 46 following a heart attack.

Selected filmography

References

External links

Arthur Hoops Kinotv.com

1870 births
1916 deaths
American male stage actors
American male film actors
American male silent film actors
Male actors from Connecticut
People from Middletown, Connecticut
20th-century American male actors